Edyairth Alberto Ortega Alatorre (born 23 January 1997) is a Mexican professional footballer who plays as a midfielder for Liga MX club Atlas.

Career statistics

Club

Honours
Atlas
Liga MX: Apertura 2021, Clausura 2022
Campeón de Campeones: 2022

References

External links

1997 births
Living people
Mexican footballers
Association football midfielders
Atlas F.C. footballers
Tampico Madero F.C. footballers
Liga MX players
Ascenso MX players
Liga Premier de México players
Tercera División de México players
Footballers from Guadalajara, Jalisco